Rikl is a Czech surname. Notable people with the surname include:

 David Rikl (born 1971), Czech tennis player
 Patrik Rikl (born 1999), Czech tennis player, son of David

See also
 Rik (given name)

Czech-language surnames